John Kelly (born July 25, 1960 in Ottawa, Ontario) is a hockey play-by-play broadcast announcer.  He is the son of the late Dan Kelly. Kelly joined his father in the broadcast booth, for a game in November 1988, as Dan Kelly announced his final game, in which the Blues defeated the Flyers for the first time in Philadelphia since January 6, 1972. Kelly joined the Blues' broadcast team for the 1989–90 season and remained on the job until 1992, when he joined the then-fledgling Tampa Bay Lightning.

Three years later, he then joined the Colorado Avalanche, who were moving from Quebec City, where they had spent 23 seasons as the Nordiques. He documented two Stanley Cup Championships in Denver, in 1995–96 and again in 2000–01. He became well known in Denver for his proclamation, "Thank you, thank you, thank you!!!!"  after a big score by the Avs and,"SAVE BY ROY!" after a good save from former Avalanche goaltender Patrick Roy. He left the Avalanche after the 2003–04 season to rejoin the Blues on their telecasts.  After the 2004–05 NHL lockout, he finally got the chance for the second time in 2005–06.

On January 13, 2000, he was confronted by Pittsburgh Penguins coach Herb Brooks for suggesting that Matthew Barnaby faked an injury after being hit by Alexei Gusarov with 27 seconds left. He was suspended two games for that confrontation on January 18, having been suspended indefinitely since January 15. The night before Brooks got suspended, Gusarov was suspended two games for the hit.

His younger brother Dan P. Kelly was the Blues' radio announcer from 1997 to 2000, before spending the next four seasons with the Columbus Blue Jackets.

In addition to the Blues, Kelly also worked the 2006 NHL playoffs on Outdoor Life Network (now NBCSN).  During the mid-1990s, he worked on some regional telecasts for the NHL on Fox. Kelly substituted for Mike Haynes, the broadcaster who took over his play-by-play role for the Avalanche,  on Altitude Sports and Entertainment during the 2008 playoffs due to Haynes' health problems.

Kelly, whose minor league hockey assignments included the St. Catharines Saints and three years with the Adirondack Red Wings, obtained his realtor license during the 2004–05 NHL lockout. He also subbed for Marv Albert on Rangers broadcasts during the late 1980s.

References 

American Hockey League broadcasters
National Hockey League broadcasters
Colorado Avalanche announcers
St. Louis Blues announcers
St. Louis Rams announcers
Tampa Bay Lightning announcers
People from Ottawa
1960 births
Living people